Laurentien (2001 census population 82,965) is a former borough of Quebec City. It comprised Val-Bélair, Cap-Rouge and part of Sainte-Foy.

Before January 1, 2006, Saint-Augustin-de-Desmaures and L'Ancienne-Lorette were also part of this borough, but they were restored as separate municipalities.

In the reorganization of Quebec City's boroughs on November 1, 2009, Laurentien was divided between the boroughs of Sainte-Foy–Sillery–Cap-Rouge and La Haute-Saint-Charles.

See also
 Municipal reorganization in Quebec

Former boroughs of Quebec City
Populated places disestablished in 2009